Chums was a boys' weekly newspaper started in 1892 by Cassell & Company and later, from 1927, published by Amalgamated Press. The publisher gathered the weekly paper into monthly and annual editions. The monthly versions were published on the 25th of the month, and up to November 1920 included all the content of the weekly editions. From then on, the monthly editions had all the story content of the weeklies, but left out the covers. This left a gap which was then filled by short stories, articles and even serials that were not included in the weekly edition. The serial ceased publication in 1941.

Chums was notably the sponsor of the Chums League, Chums Society of Stamp Collectors, Chums Scouts, the British Boy Scouts and the British Boys Naval Brigade/National Naval Cadets. Chums is one of the most highly sought-after boys' papers by collectors due to its distinctive and attractively illustrated red covers.

History
Started by Cassell & Company in 1892 as a weekly newspaper for boys, it was apparently modeled on — and in competition for readers with — The Boy's Own Paper, having articles and stories covering various topics. Chums launched with a serial "For Glory and Renown" by D. H. Parry and articles on football training, Harrow School, and Julius Caesar in Britain. Initially Chums had problems gaining readers but two serials, "The Iron Pirate", by first editor Max Pemberton in 1892, and Treasure Island by Robert Louis Stevenson in 1894, pushed the paper into some success. It is interesting to note that when Treasure Island was first published as a serial in Young Folks in 1881, it was not a success. Robert Leighton, a sub-editor, said that as a serial, it was a failure, as it took too long to get to the action.

Amalgamated Press buys
Amalgamated Press bought Chums in January 1927 and continued it as a weekly.  With the 2 July 1932 issue, its publishing schedule was reduced to a monthly issue.  The last monthly issue was in July 1934 and became an annual publication issued in September.  The serial ceased publication with its 9 September 1941 issue due to wartime paper shortages.

Format
Chums was issued in three different formats, weekly, monthly, and annually.  While initially published as a weekly paper, a monthly edition was issued including all the weekly issues with a color cover.  Some material was only included in the weekly or monthly formats.  In the weekly, this showed up as an eight-page article insert pages numbered i-viii.  The monthly had a color print included.

Sponsorship of youth organizations

Chums Scouts & British Boy Scouts
Chums "On the Watch Tower" news column reported on 11 September 1907 that Robert Baden-Powell's Brownsea Island Scout camp was proposed and his recommendation that Boy Scout groups should be formed. In the 12 February 1908 issue, the editor indicated there was a reader proposing to start a scout company under the "Chum Scout" name and suggested that they wear the 'Chums' League badge. In the next issue, the editor indicated more readers had written in about starting a League of Chums Scouts with a reply that they were in discussions with Baden-Powell.  The following issue had an article on the Brownsea Island Camp by Baden-Powell and indicated future news on the proposed 'Chums' League of Scouts.  However, the publication then fell silent on the 'Chum' Scouts.  In October 1908, a recurring character, Waggles, made fun of boy scouts. The silence, then the turnabout to being negative may have stemmed from C. Arthur Pearson Limited launching The Scout paper which was denoted as "founded by" Baden-Powell and the "Official Journal" of Baden-Powell's own Boy Scout organization.

In June 1909, Chums started including boy scout stories. In the 30 June issue, the editor's column indicated that the Chum scouts patrols were still going "strong" and that a union of the various patrols was being considered. Chums announced the launch of the British Boy Scouts as a national organisation in the 21 July 1909 issue. A British Boy Scout column was included in future issues, later becoming a full page. Chums indicated in late December that the BBS had gained members in Australia, Africa, and Canada. Chums also includes some of the earliest references to "Sea Scouts'''". In mid-1911, the BBS column ended when the original BBS leaders, H. Moore and W.G. Whitby, left the BBS.

British Boys Naval Brigade / National Naval Cadets
In March 1909, Chums sponsored The British Boys Naval Brigade, a uniformed youth organization for boys ages 10 to 17.  With the Brigade's launch in May as a national organization, it changed its name to The National Naval Cadets.  The organization's columns in Chums were of an instructional nature rather than a news journal.  Chums was also used as an enrolment tool. By June articles on the National Naval Cadets subtitled it, first as "Scouts of the Sea" then later "Sea Scouts of the Empire".

The British Boy Scouts and National Naval Cadets were both headquartered in Battersea, London. Chums referred to them together as Chums United Service.

 Writers 
The following list of authors is by no means complete:
L. J. Beeston
Harry Blyth
Herbert Eastwick Compton
Arthur J. Daniels
George Manville Fenn
Henry Frith
G. A. Henty
Andrew Home
Ascott R. Hope
J. R. Hutchinson
Warren Killingworth
Robert Leighton
John K. Leys
John Mackie
Standish O'Grady
Barry Pain
D. H. Parry
Max Pemberton
Arthur Rigby
Robert Louis Stevenson
S. Walkey
Fred Whishaw

 Artists 
The following artist represent only some of those who illustrated stories in ChumsStanley Berkeley
Gordon Browne
Tom Browne. R. I.
J. Finnemore
Paul Hardy
Charles Harrison
George Wylie Hutchinson
Godfrey Merry
A. Monro
Harry Payne
Alfred Pearce
Charles L. Pott
Richard Simkin
C. J. Staniland, R. I.

See alsoBoys' LifeBoys' Own''

References

Defunct newspapers published in the United Kingdom
Children's magazines published in the United Kingdom
Publications disestablished in 1941
Newspapers established in 1892
1892 establishments in the United Kingdom
Cassell (publisher) books